Tabernanthalog is a novel water-soluble, non-toxic azepinoindole analog of the psychoactive drug ibogaine first synthesized by Professor David E. Olson at  UC Davis.

In rodents, it was found to promote structural neural plasticity, reduce drug seeking behavior, and produce antidepressant like effects. Due to the rapidly-induced and enduring neuroplasticity, Tabernanthalog is a member of the class of compounds known as non-hallucinogenic  psychoplastogens. This compound, as well as related compounds, are licensed by Delix Therapeutics and are being developed as potential medicines for neuropsychiatric disorders.

See also 

 PNU-22394
 Psychoplastogen
 Delix Therapeutics
 David E. Olson

References 

Tryptamines
Heterocyclic compounds with 3 rings
Methoxy compounds